L'enfance de l'art is a 1988 French drama film directed by Francis Girod. It was entered into the 1988 Cannes Film Festival.

Cast
 Clotilde de Bayser – Marie
 Michel Bompoil – Simon
 Anne-Marie Philipe – Régine
 Yves Lambrecht – Jean-Paul
 Marie-Armelle Deguy – Ludivine
 Régine Cendre – Martine
 Bruno Wolkowitch – Samuel
 Etienne Pommeret – Lucas
 Yves Dangerfield – Philippe (as Vincent Vallier)
 Hélène Alexandridis – Juliette
 André Dussollier – Luc Ferrand
 Laurence Masliah – Valérie
 Pierre Gérard – Louis
 Olivia Brunaux – Lydia
 Judith Magre
 Dominique Besnehard

References

External links

1988 films
1980s French-language films
1988 drama films
Films directed by Francis Girod
French drama films
1980s French films